Fletcherite is a rare thiospinel sulfide mineral with formula . It is an opaque metallic steel gray mineral which crystallizes in the cubic crystal system. It is a member of the linnaeite group.

It was first described in 1977 for an occurrence in the Fletcher Mine, Viburnum Trend (New Lead Belt), near  Centerville, Reynolds County, Missouri.

It occurs as a dissemination within copper sulfide minerals in mineralization replacing dolomite at the type locality in the Fletcher
mine where it is associated with vaesite, pyrite, covellite, chalcopyrite, bornite and digenite. In an occurrence in Kalgoorlie, Australia it is found in black slate associated with pyrrhotite.

References

Sulfide minerals
Cubic minerals
Minerals in space group 227
Thiospinel group